The 2022 Copa de la Liga Profesional (officially the Copa Binance 2022 for sponsorship reasons) was the third edition of the Copa de la Liga Profesional, an Argentine domestic cup. It began on 10 February and ended on 22 May 2022.

The competition was contested by 28 teams, 26 clubs from the 2021 Primera División season plus two teams promoted from the Primera Nacional (Tigre and Barracas Central). After the end of the Copa de la Liga, it will start the 2022 Primera División season, in order to complete the schedule prior to the 2022 FIFA World Cup. Colón were the defending champions but were eliminated in the group stage.

Boca Juniors won their second title after they defeated Tigre 3–0 in the final. As champions, Boca Juniors qualified for the 2023 Copa Libertadores and the 2022 Trofeo de Campeones.

As Boca Juniors qualified for the Copa Libertadores group stage by winning the 2022 Argentine Primera División, Racing (best team in the 2022 aggregate table) earned the Copa de la Liga Profesional berth.

Format
For the group stage, the 28 teams were drawn into two groups of fourteen teams each, playing on a single round-robin basis. Additionally, each team played one interzonal match against its rival team in the other zone. In each group, the top four teams advanced to the quarter-finals. The final stages (quarter-finals, semi-finals and final) were played on a single-legged basis.

Draw
The draw for the group stage was held on 11 January 2022, 15:00, at the Hilton Hotel in Buenos Aires. The 28 teams were drawn into two groups of fourteen containing one team from each of the interzonal matches.

Group stage
In the group stage, each group was played on a single round-robin basis. Additionally, in the seventh round, each team played one interzonal match against its rival team in the other zone. Teams were ranked according to the following criteria: 1. Points (3 points for a win, 1 point for a draw, and 0 points for a loss); 2. Goal difference; 3. Goals scored; 4. Head-to-head points; 5. Head-to-head goal difference; 6. Head-to-head goals scored; 7. Play off match; 8. Draw.

The top four teams of each group advanced to the quarter-finals.

Zone A

Zone B

Results

Zone A

Zone B

Interzonal matches

Final stages
Starting from the quarter-finals, the teams played a single-elimination tournament on a single-leg basis with the following rules:
 In the quarter-finals the higher-seeded team hosted the leg, while the semi-finals were played at a neutral venue.
 If tied, a penalty shoot-out would be used to determine the winners.
 The Final was played at a neutral venue.
 If tied, extra time would be played. If the score was still tied after extra time, a penalty shoot-out would be used to determine the champions.

Bracket

Quarter-finals

|}

Matches

Semi-finals

|}

Matches

Final

|}

Match

Season statistics

Top goalscorers

Source: AFA

Top assists

Source: AFA

References

External links 
 LPF official site

A
2022 in Argentine football